Michael Dryden is an Australian former professional rugby league footballer who played in the 1970s.

Mick Dryden was a lanky lower grade forward with the St George Dragons during the Jack Gibson era. He featured in two seasons at Saints between 1970-1971, and came on as a replacement player for an injured Peter Fitzgerald in the 1971 Grand Final. 

During his two seasons at St. George Dragons, Dryden played a total of 49 games for the club: 8 Third Grade, 37 Reserve Grade and 4 First grade games. 

He then joined the Balmain Tigers for one season in 1972, mainly playing in the lower grades before retiring.

References

St. George Dragons players
Balmain Tigers players
Australian rugby league players
Living people
Year of birth missing (living people)
Place of birth missing (living people)
Rugby articles needing expert attention
Rugby league second-rows